Endless Harmony: The Beach Boys Story is a 1998 biographical documentary directed by Alan Boyd. The film is a biography of the American rock band The Beach Boys. The documentary features archived footage and interviews by band members along with interviews from musicians such as Jackson Browne, Glen Campbell, Elvis Costello, and Sean Lennon. The soundtrack to the documentary was released along with the documentary's release.

Certifications

External links
 

1998 films
Films about the Beach Boys
Films directed by Alan Boyd
Documentary films about musical groups
1990s English-language films
1990s American films